Jung Woon-sun is a South Korean actress. She is known for her roles in dramas such as Happiness and Forecasting Love and Weather. She also appeared movies Phone, The Case of Itaewon Homicide and The Sword with No Name.

Biography and career 
She was encouraged by her teacher in second year of elementary school to try acting and suggested it to her parents. She started working as a child actress in educational programs but she couldn't attend school regularly so her parents forced her to quit it and so she focus on her studies. She attended Dongguk University there she studied theatre after graduating. She signed with Ace Factory and started working in dramas, musical shows and theatre.

Filmography

Television series

Film

Stage

Musical

Theatre

Awards and nominations

References

External links 
 
 

1983 births
Living people
21st-century South Korean actresses
South Korean television actresses
South Korean film actresses